The 2018 European Athletics U18 Championships was the second edition of the biennial, continental athletics competition for European athletes aged fifteen to seventeen. It was held in Győr, Hungary from 5 to 8 July at the Olympic Sport Park.

Medal summary
Legend
  (World U18 Best),  (World U18 Leader),  (European U18 Best),  (European U18 Leader),  (Championship Record),  (National U18 Record),  (Personal Best),  (Season Best)

Boys

Track

* Indicates the athlete only competed in the preliminary heats and received medals.

Field

Combined

Girls

Track

* Indicates the athlete only competed in the preliminary heats and received medals.

Field

Combined

Medal table

Notes
 Medals won by athletes competing as Authorised Neutral Athletes were not included in the official medal table.

Participating nations
1135 competitors (538 boys and 597 girls) from 50 countries are expected to compete.

Records

Under-18 World Best Performances

Championship Records

References

External links
 Official web site
 Results book (archived)

European Athletics U18 Championships
International athletics competitions hosted by Hungary
Sport in Győr
European Youth Athletics Championships
Athletics Youth Championships
European Youth Athletics Championships
European Athletics Youth Championships
2018 in youth sport